was a general in the Imperial Japanese Army during World War II.

Career
A native of Wakayama Prefecture, Hayashi was a graduate of the 26th class of the Imperial Japanese Army Academy in 1914, and of the 35th class of the Army Staff College in 1923.

At the outset of the Second Sino-Japanese War, he was assigned to the Kwantung Army, and was on the planning team for the successful Operation Chahar in northern China.  From 1938-1940, Hayashi served with the garrison forces in Taiwan.
 
In 1940, during the preparations for the invasion of Southeast Asia, Hayashi was put in command of the Taiwan Army Research Section, tasked with investigating issues with tropical warfare.  He was promoted to major general in 1941.  From 1941-1942, Hayashi was Vice Chief of Staff of the IJA 14th Area Army.

He was given a field command in 1943, when he was assigned command of the IJA 54th Division.  In 1943-5, Hayashi was commander of the IJA 24th Independent Mixed Brigade in Burma. He became commander of the IJA 53rd Division in Burma in 1945. He was promoted to lieutenant-general in 1945. After the surrender of Japan, he was held for investigation of possible war crimes and incarcerated at Manila, Philippines until July 1953.

References

Books

External links

Notes 

1891 births
1978 deaths
People from Wakayama Prefecture
Imperial Japanese Army generals of World War II
Japanese generals
Japanese military personnel of World War II